King of Swing may refer to:
Count Basie (1904–1984), American jazz pianist, bandleader, organist, and composer
King of Swing, a 1956 album by Count Basie Orchestra
Benny Goodman (1909–1986), American jazz clarinetist and bandleader
Fletcher Henderson (1897–1952), American big band leader
DK King of Swing, a video game